Pago Pago International Airport , also known as Tafuna Airport, is a public airport located 7 miles (11.3 km) southwest of the central business district of Pago Pago, in the village and plains of Tafuna on the island of Tutuila in American Samoa, an unincorporated territory of the United States.

3,099 flights arrived at Pago Pago International Airport in 2014, down from 3,665 in 2013. Incoming flights carried 55,728 passengers in 2014, while flights carrying 57,355 passengers took off from the airport. 1.8 million pounds of cargo and 1.3 million pounds of mail were brought in by commercial carriers.

History

Tafuna Airfield
The site and location of the current airport was originally known as Tafuna Airfield.  It was part of U.S. Naval Station Tutuila - Samoa Defense Group Area and was partially constructed before war broke out in the Pacific on December 7, 1941. Two airstrips were completed and opened on March 17, 1942.

The airfield was first utilized on March 19, 1942 by U.S. Marine Fighting Squadron VMF-111 which arrived by ship from San Diego, California.  VMF-111 aircraft were off loaded in Pago Pago harbor and trucked to Tafuna airfield.  The first planes from MAG-13 also arrived at Tafuna Airfield on April 2, 1942 at which point they assumed responsibility for the air defense of American Samoa.  Marine Torpedo Bombing Squadron VMO-151 arrived in early May 1942 at Tafuna Airfield where all three squadrons were based during the early part of the Pacific War.  VMF-111 was eventually transitioned and based at Faleolo Airfield in Western (British) Samoa after Faleolo airfield was completed in July 1942 to protect Upolu and Savai'i islands.

The original runway alignments were 09/27 ( x ) and 14/32 ( x ) and were constructed of compact coral with capability to handle 65 fighter aircraft and 12 medium to heavy bombers. The runways were lighted.  The main terminal airfield buildings, a large hangar and control tower were located at the edge of today's runway 08/26 and at what is today the Tafuna Industrial Park area.

Leone Airfield
In conjunction with the airstrip at Tafuna, an emergency Bomber airstrip was also constructed in the village of Leone, known then as Leone Airfield in early 1943. It was situated on what is today Leone High School and Midkiff Elementary School on the western edge of Tutuila Island.  Leone Airfield was  x  and was completed on September 30, 1943.  It had a short life during the war. The airfield was abandoned in early 1945 due to turbulent air currents and lack of use. Only two aircraft were recorded to have landed and taken off from the airfield. A visual outline of Leone Airfield can be seen from the air today with a straight clearance road starting from the WVUV-AM radio tower to Midkiff Elementary School.

Pago Pago International Airport

Pre-jet service
Pago Pago International Airport and the original Tafuna Airfield military facilities were first used for commercial trans pacific air service in November 1946 when Pan American Airways resumed service from Honolulu to Australia and New Zealand. Pan American utilized Douglas DC-4s, and eventually upgraded to Douglas DC-7C aircraft in 1956 (when Pago Pago International Airport was upgraded as a commercial airport) for its Honolulu / Canton Island / Pago Pago / Nadi / Auckland and Sydney route. This service was conducted using the outbased DC-7C aircraft Clipper Seven Seas N743PA and Clipper Pacific Trader N744PA
 on the route and continued until November 1965.

It was also used for inter island air service between Faleolo, Western Samoa and Pago Pago in 1959 by newly formed, Apia-based Polynesian Airlines and short-lived, Pago Pago-based Samoa Airways using ex-military Douglas C-47B-45-DK (DC-3D) type aircraft.

Tasman Empire Airways Limited, or TEAL, the predecessor to what is now Air New Zealand, offered Douglas DC-6 (eventually using Lockheed L-188 Electra aircraft in 1960) flights from Nadi to Pago Pago and onwards to Tahiti in 1954 as part of its Coral Route Service.

The Jet Age
Pago Pago International Airport went through major re-construction in 1963 under the U.S. President Kennedy administration.

The terminal buildings at the airport were dedicated on November 23, 1965. Dignitaries attending included Senator Henry M. Jackson, Chairman of the Senate Committee on Interior and Insular Affairs; Representative Michael J. Kirwan, Chairman of the House Subcommittee on Appropriations, Interior and Insular Affairs; Malietoa Tanumafili II; and Prince Tāufaʻāhau Tupou IV, Prime Minister of Tonga.

Runway designation 09/27 which was the primary runway for commercial air service in the 1950s and early 1960s was deactivated after the newer, longer runway 05/23 was open for aircraft flights. Pago Pago International Airport was opened to jet service in 1964 to stimulate tourism and a new local economy.

Trans Pacific jet service and height of commercial aviation

South Pacific jet services between Sydney (Australia), Auckland (New Zealand), Honolulu (Hawaii) and Papeete (Tahiti) were first offered by Pan American World Airways in 1964 using Boeing 707 aircraft.  Air New Zealand, which was already flying the Auckland / Nadi / Pago Pago / Papeete route using Lockheed L-188 Electra aircraft shifted to Douglas DC-8 aircraft in November 1965. In 1970 American Airlines began flying the Honolulu / Pago Pago / Sydney route using Boeing 707 aircraft.  UTA French Airlines began Douglas DC-10 service in 1975 between Noumea, New Caledonia and Papeete, Tahiti via Pago Pago.  Continental Airlines also began DC-10 service from Honolulu to Sydney and Auckland via Pago Pago in 1979.

Pago Pago International Airport went through its peak in aviation between 1975 and 1985.  During this period Pan American (using Boeing 747s), Air New Zealand (using DC-8s), UTA French Airlines (using DC-10s),  Continental Airlines (using DC-10s), Hawaiian Airlines (using a DC-8), South Pacific Island Airways (using Boeing 707s), Samoa Air (using a Boeing 707), Arrow Air (using a DC-8), Air Nauru (Boeing 737 and  Boeing 727), and Air Pacific (using a BAC One-Eleven) were all plying the South Pacific via Pago Pago. One could travel between Pago Pago and Honolulu for an airfare of US$99 one-way.

Cargo commercial aviation
Towards the end of its peak commercial passenger aviation period, Pago Pago International Airport also became an ideal refueling stopover for cargo carriers due to the low cost of fuel and landing fees at the time. Cargo carriers such as Kalitta Air, Evergreen International Airlines, and Polar Air Cargo would provide at least daily Boeing 747 cargo flights to Pago Pago from the US and from Asia Pacific between 1990 and 2006.

Downturn in airport usage and travel
The airport was a vital link to the Samoan Islands until the runway at Faleolo International Airport in Independent Samoa was improved and lengthened to handle larger than Boeing 737 type aircraft in 1984. With a population that is 3.5 times greater than American Samoa plus greater emphasis that was put on tourism growth, international airline traffic particularly from Australia, New Zealand and the South Pacific island countries began to shift from Pago Pago to Faleolo airport. Airlines with flights from the US to Australia and New Zealand also started utilizing aircraft that did not require a refueling stopover in Pago Pago. By the late 1980s and due to heavy competition and economics, only one passenger air carrier (Hawaiian Airlines) remained to serve the Pago Pago trans pacific route.

Runway and facility expansion
Runway 09/27 was the primary commercial runway for aircraft in the 1950s and early 1960s. The runway was deactivated after runway 05/23 was constructed and activated in 1964. Runway 08/26 is widely used today by air taxi operators flying to Apia (Fagali'i and Faleolo), Ofu or Tau.

The Departure and Arrival terminal also went through a major expansion in the mid-1970s where buildings and space was doubled in size to handle more passengers.

On October 13 and 19, 2009, the world's largest and heaviest aircraft, the Antonov An-225 landed at Pago Pago International Airport to deliver emergency power generation equipment during the 2009 Samoa earthquake and tsunami.

Apollo space program

Pago Pago International Airport had historic significance with the U.S. Apollo Program.
The astronaut crews of Apollo 10, 12, 13, 14, and 17 were retrieved a few hundred miles from Pago Pago and transported by helicopter to the airport prior to being flown to Honolulu on Lockheed C-141 Starlifter military aircraft.

Today
Hawaiian Airlines is the only major airline serving Pago Pago International Airport. In 2004, with assistance from the American Samoan government to promote and bring additional air carriers to Pago Pago, Aloha Airlines opened a Honolulu / Pago Pago / Rarotonga route. However, the airline lasted 11 months and eventually pulled out of Pago Pago and other South Pacific routes it served due to financial issues.

The airport covers 700 acres (283 ha) of land.

In 2014, there were 2,628 flights between Pago Pago and Samoa, and 162 flights between Honolulu and Pago Pago.

A weekly cargo flight from Honolulu, Hawaii is provided by Asia Pacific Airlines.

Pago Pago International Airport is a frequent stopover for United States military aircraft flying in the South Pacific and is the only airport in the area with TACAN capabilities.

Daily inter-island flights between the Samoas are offered by Samoa Airways and Talofa Airways.

The American Samoan government is looking into legal means to overcome current US cabotage rules that forbid foreign carriers from entering and serving the Pago Pago – Honolulu or Pago Pago – Los Angeles routes.

There are regular buses that run between the airport and downtown.

Airlines and destinations

Passenger

Cargo

Status and expansion
A new US$12 million Aircraft Rescue and Firefighting (ARFF) Fire Crash station was completed in 2005.

A US$18 million Hot Fire/Crash Training facility was constructed and completed in 2008 and was to be used to train ARFF personnel, and other Fire Crash personnel from various airports in the South Pacific.

In 2010, Pago Pago International Airport underwent a US$1 million terminal remodeling and modernization with funding from the American Recovery and Reinvestment Act of 2009. The departure terminal, immigration, and Transportation Security Administration (TSA) security and lounge areas were completely renovated and expanded to increase passenger capacity and flow.

A new control tower has been planned since 2006, but has been delayed due to arguments over funding and lack of traffic. Currently international traffic to Pago Pago is controlled from Faleolo International Airport in Samoa.

Facilities

Terminal and gates

Accidents and incidents
On January 30, 1974 at about 11:41 pm Samoa local time, a Boeing 707 operating as Pan Am Flight 806 from Auckland, New Zealand, to Los Angeles, California with en route stops in Pago Pago and Honolulu, clipped trees at an elevation of 113 feet and about 3,865 feet short of the runway 05 threshold. The first impact with the ground was about 236 feet further along the crash path. The aircraft continued through the jungle vegetation, struck a three-foot-high lava rock wall, and stopped about 3,090 feet from the runway threshold. There were 97 fatalities out of 101 occupants on the aircraft.

References

External links

 FAA airport information for Pago Pago International Airport – PPG (NSTU) 
 
 Resources for this airport:
 
 
 
 

Airports in American Samoa
Airport
Tafuna, American Samoa
Tutuila